Simon Bedwell (born 1963 in Croydon, Surrey) is an English artist based in London.

He has shown work internationally in many exhibitions including solo shows “The Furnishers” at White Columns in New York City, “Galleon and Other Stories” at the Saatchi Gallery in London, “England Their England” at Laden fur Nichts in Leipzig, “Beck's Futures 2004” at the ICA in London and the CCA in Glasgow, Cell Project Space, London, 2004, Studio Voltaire London, 2009, Piper Keys, London and Hospitalfield House, Arbroath in 2017.

Simon Bedwell spent most of his art career as a member of the London-based collective BANK, since the group’s 2003 split becoming a successful artist in his own right. His most widely known works combine second-hand posters with carefully selected slogans produced using WordArt, stencils and spray paint.  This strand of Bedwell’s practice is typical of his methods; the juxtaposition of found imagery with purpose built text creates an often funny, politically apposite, yet highly convincing brand-new object.  His work functions via a critique of advertising, logoism, signs and signifiers; picking holes in means of representation favoured by the mass media to discover the limits of tolerance and relevance of ‘rebellious’ acts, and believability, within a given context.
Following the solo exhibition Gents: A Melodrama with 2 Acts at Platform, London in 2005, Bedwell's work has featured a mix of more complicated subject matter and concerns. As Matthew Higgs wrote for Bedwell press release for 2007's White Columns show, 'In his works Bedwell often collides conflicting aesthetics and visual languages, which variously include soft-porn imagery, the popular gothic (often in the form of horror movie posters), institutional and bureaucratic architecture(s), advertising, modernist painting, and sardonic sloganeering. Seen together, Bedwell’s interventions establish a complex narrative that both engages with and confuses contemporary political and social mores. With a deft humor his work both conflates and disrupts issues of class, race, sexual politics and art.' 
Throughout July 2011 he curated The Hole, a series of 5 'long weekend' exhibitions in a newly built space off Walworth Road, London, featuring new work from Katrina Palmer, Lucy Clout, Phillip Lai, Tom Benson, Alice Channer, Leah Capaldi and Claire Carter, alongside work from Merve Kaptan and Laure Prouvost and others, in configurations changing daily and all featuring performances. Photography and film was banned, and each weekend had its own numbered publication.
From 2011 to date, Bedwell has been concentrating on ceramic sculpture.

BANK consisted of Bedwell and other artists – Dino Demosthenous, David Burrows, John Russell, Milly Thompson and Andrew Williamson – who, throughout the 1990s and up until 2003, were a consistent presence on the London art-scene.  BANK regularly hosted shows in their own warehouse space which combined the work of the group with that of other, often very well known, artists in schizophrenic installations where it was often impossible to tell where one work ended and another began.  The group also regularly produced art-world-baiting material in the form of satirical exhibition invitations, provocative show titles, their own tabloid newspaper ridiculing the excesses of the London scene and a campaign to improve gallery press releases that involved returning said documents to galleries with corrections to grammar and tips for improvement.

References

External links
Simon Bedwell at ArtFacts.Net
Simon Bedwell – Saatchi Gallery

English artists
Living people
1963 births
People from Croydon